Yaylacık (literally "little highland") is a Turkish place name that may refer to the following places in Turkey:

 Yaylacık, Amasya, a village in the district of Amasya, Amasya Province
 Yaylacık, Ardahan, a village in the district of Ardahan, Ardahan Province
 Yaylacık, Ardanuç, a village in the district of Ardanuç, Artvin Province
 Yaylacık, Burhaniye
 Yaylacık, Bayramiç
 Yaylacık, Çermik
 Yaylacık, Ezine
 Yaylacık, Gölbaşı, a village in the district of Gölbaşı, Adıyaman Province
 Yaylacık, Horasan
 Yaylacık, İspir
 Yaylacık, Mudanya
 Yaylacık, Nilüfer
 Yaylacık, Ortaköy
 Yaylacık, Sındırgı, a village
 Yaylacık, Tercan

See also
 Yayla, the root word